The Swamp Fox is a television miniseries produced by Walt Disney Studios and starring Leslie Nielsen as American Revolutionary War hero Francis Marion.

The theme song ("Swamp Fox, Swamp Fox, tail on his hat...") was sung by Nielsen as well. Myron Healey played Marion's top aide, Maj./Col. Peter Horry. One of the Swamp Fox's adversaries was Colonel Banastre Tarleton, played by John Sutton.  Patrick Macnee played a British captain, Tim Considine played Marion's nephew Gabe Marion and Slim Pickens played Plunkett, one of the Swamp Fox's men. Hal Stalmaster appeared in three of the eight episodes as "Gwynn." The Swamp Fox did not bring to Disney the commercial success that had been achieved by Davy Crockett.

The series encompassed eight intermittent episodes running from 1959 to 1961 as part of Walt Disney Presents. Episodes were presented on Sundays on ABC from 6:30 to 7:30 p.m. and were also broadcast by CBC Television.

The Disney Channel reran Swamp Fox episodes in the 1980s and 1990s, while Nielsen was at the height of a second career as a white-haired comedy movie star.  The first three episodes of the series were also released in 2005 on DVD (in a set including three episodes of The Nine Lives of Elfego Baca).

Episodes

See also
 List of television series and miniseries about the American Revolution
 List of films about the American Revolution

References

External links
 

Television series about the American Revolution
Television series by Disney
American folklore films and television series
1959 American television series debuts
1961 American television series endings
American Broadcasting Company original programming